Réva (Wine), or Dívka s hrozny (Girl with grapes), is an outdoor statue, installed in 1960 at Kampa Park in Prague, Czech Republic. The statue is a typical work of Karla Vobišová-Žáková, the first Czech professional female sculptor, aimed to figural and portrait sculptures. The almost life-size statue was created from Carrara marble, the piedestal from sandstone. The statue is separately registered and protected as a cultural monument since 1964. The last restoration was made in 1997.

External links

 
 Réva (Dívka s hrozny), Karla Vobišová-Žáková, 1960, website Vetřelci a volavky (Aliens and Herons) : Fine arts in public space of 1970s and 1980s in CSSR, project leader Pavel Karous
 Socha Réva, reg. no. 86714/1-477, Památkový katalog (Monument Catalogue), Národní památkový ústav (National Heritage Institute)
 socha Réva (dívka s hrozny), MonumNet, Národní památkový ústav (National Heritage Institute) 
 Památky ve správě MČ Praha 1 (Monuments managed by the district of Prague 1): Réva
 Před 120 lety se narodila první česká sochařka, Noviny Prahy 2, 16 April 2007, Karel Žák, syn

Marble sculptures
Outdoor sculptures in Prague
Sculptures of women in Prague
Statues in Prague